In Winnipeg on April 5, 1974, the Selkirk Steelers won the MJHL title claiming the Turnbull Memorial Trophy. There was no stopping the Selkirk Steelers on April 19, 1974, in Prince Albert, as the Steelers defeated the Prince Albert Raiders of the Saskatchewan Junior Hockey League winning the Anavet Cup. On May 1, 1974, with a 5-2 win over Kelowna Buckaroos of the British Columbia Hockey League in the seventh and deciding game, held in Kelowna, the Steelers captured the Abbott Cup and advanced into the national final for the Centennial Cup. In the seventh and deciding game, on May 14, 1974, in Ottawa, the Selkirk Steelers scored a dramatic 1-0 overtime victory over the Smiths Falls Bears of the Central Junior A Hockey League to capture the Centennial Cup, emblematic of junior A hockey supremacy in Canada.

League notes
The MJHL returns to Brandon, as the Brandon Travellers join the North Division. The Travellers were owned and operated by the Brandon Wheat Kings of the Western Canada Hockey League.

The 1974 Selkirk Steelers were inducted into the Manitoba Hockey Hall of Fame.

Regular season

All-Star game
The Manitoba Junior Hockey League All-Stars took a 3-0 lead in the first period and then received a lesson in the Finnish technique of playing hockey as the Finnish National Juniors skated away to a 6-3 victory at the Winnipeg Arena Thursday night, December 20.Carl Haney opened the scoring at the 0:31 second mark with an unassisted goal, John Mazur then made it 2-0 at 14:17 and 52 seconds later Don Hansford completed the Manitoba club's scoring. Finland's Jarmo Haellfors scored a power-play goal at 18:24 and Jonni Rinne completed a
neat three-way passing play 17 seconds later and the first period ended 3-2. Rinne scored his second goal of the game at 3:29 of the second period to tie the game and that's the way the second period ended. In the final period, the Finns dominated every aspect of the game, scoring three unanswered
goals. Kari Eloranta gave his club the lead and Haellfors completed his hat trick with a pair of goals.

MJHL Lineup:
Goal: Blaine Peterson (Brandon); Norm Tesluk (West Kildonan); Glen Hanlon (Brandon)
Defence: Jamie Bannerman (St. James); 
Forwards: Dan Bonar (Portage); Mike Bradbury (Brandon); Bob Clemmens (Kenora); Jim Gustafson (Kenora); Carl Haney (Kenora); Gary Kaluzniak (Selkirk); John Mazur (St. Boniface); Murray McCarthy (St. James); Bob Miller (Portage); Jim Misener (Dauphin); Marlin Vanrobaeys (Selkirk); Keith Yann (Winnipeg)
Doug Overton, Coach; Doug Clarke, Assistant Coach (Brandon)

Playoffs
Division Semi-Finals
Brandon lost to Portage 4-games-to-2
St. Boniface defeated St. James 4-games-to-2
Divisional Finals
Selkirk defeated Portage 4-games-to-3
West Kildonan defeated St. Boniface 4-games-to-none
Turnbull Cup Championship
West Kildonan lost to Selkirk 4-games-to-1
Anavet Cup Championship
Selkirk defeated Prince Albert Raiders (SJHL) 4-games-to-2
Abbott Cup Championship
Selkirk defeated Kelowna Buckaroos (BCHL) 4-games-to-3
Centennial Cup Championship
Selkirk defeated Smiths Falls Bears  (CJHL) 4-games-to-3

Awards

All-Star Teams

References
Manitoba Junior Hockey League
Manitoba Hockey Hall of Fame
Hockey Hall of Fame
Winnipeg Free Press Archives
Brandon Sun Archives

MJHL
Manitoba Junior Hockey League seasons